Tianmen South railway station is a railway station located in Tianmen City, Hubei Province, People's Republic of China, on the Hankou-Yichang Railway.

During the planning station, the station was called "Xiantao", because it is actually closer to Xiantao's main urban area than to Tianmen's.

Tianmen South is second-busiest (after Jingzhou) passenger station out of the six intermediate stations of the Hanyi Railway. As of late 2012, on an average day, 3,000 to 4,000 passengers use it, with the daily ridership rising to around 7,500 passenger during busiest period. It is anticipated that the station may handle up to 20,000 passengers per day during the next Chinese New Year peak period.

Service

History
Tianmen South railway station was opened for passenger service on July 1, 2012, along with the new Wuhan–Yichang railway. It is expected that by the end of 2012 freight operations will start at this station as well.

Nearby stations
 Xiantao West railway station

References

Railway stations in Hubei